Syrinx is a 1973 public artwork by German-born American sculptor Adolph Wolter located at the Indiana World War Memorial Plaza in Indianapolis, Indiana, United States.

Description

It is a bronze figure of Syrinx sitting on a limestone tree stump. Syrinx is nude, and her proper right knee is bent upwards to her chest with her other leg hanging over the side of the stump. She holds her hand to her ear, cupping it, "listening" to the music of the nearby sculpture of the satyr Pan, who plays a flute.

Information

In 1923 Myra Reynolds Richards created Syrinx and Pan for installation at University Park at the Indiana World War Memorial Plaza. Eventually, both pieces were stolen, with Syrinx disappearing in 1959 and Pan being stolen in 1970. The parks department commissioned Adolph Wolter to replace the pieces, and in 1973 they were reinstalled in their current location in University Park at the Plaza.

References

External links

Indiana War Memorial Commission Picture Tour.
Syrinx on Flickr.

Outdoor sculptures in Indianapolis
1973 sculptures
Bronze sculptures in Indiana
Nymphs
Stolen works of art
Statues in Indianapolis
1973 establishments in Indiana
Sculptures of classical mythology